The Young Veins was an American rock band from Topanga, California. The band was composed of Ryan Ross and Jon Walker, two former members of the Las Vegas band Panic! at the Disco, along with bassist Andy Soukal, drummer Nick Murray and keyboardist Nick White.

History
On July 6, 2009, Ryan Ross and Jon Walker left Panic! at the Disco, citing creative differences as the reason for their departure. On July 28, it was announced via MTV that the duo would re-debut as a retro-leaning rock band called The Young Veins. With their first song "Change" releasing on their Myspace page,  the same day as Panic! at the Disco's first single without the members, "New Perspective." MTV credited The Young Veins with "attempting to steal [Panic!'s] thunder," to which Panic! drummer 
Spencer Smith responded with "No, I wasn't shocked or mad at all. We had about three weeks of people not knowing what was going on with the bands, and it's kind of nice that the music was released at the same time." In October 2009, Ryan announced that the band's first album, Take a Vacation! had successfully been recorded and were looking for a new label to publish the album, following the expiration of Ryan's contract with Fueled by Ramen.

The band played their first show on March 15, 2010, at The Echo in Los Angeles, alongside artists such as Alex Greenwald, Z Berg, Jenny Lewis, and Edward Sharpe. In May of that year, it was announced that the band would begin playing their first tour on June 11, debuting members Nick Murray on drums, Andy Soukal on bass and Nick White on keyboards. Three songs from Take a Vacation! were released as singles in April and May 2010, and the album itself was released in June 2010. 

On December 10, 2010, guitarist Jon Walker announced via Twitter that the band would go on a hiatus. As of February 2023, however, the band has not reunited.

In 2019, the band released a deluxe edition of Take a Vacation! online.

Musical style
AllMusic biographer Andrew Leahey described the band's sound as being "vintage pop/rock", influenced by the Cookies, the Kinks, and the Cramps. AllMusic reviewer Mark Deming considered Take a Vacation! (2010) as being inspired by "early British Invasion era pop/rock", specifically listing bands such as the Kinks, the Hollies and the Searchers.

Discography

Studio albums

Singles

Members
 Ryan Ross – vocals, guitars (2009–2010)
 Jon Walker – vocals, guitars (2009–2010)
 Andy Soukal – bass guitar, backing vocals (2010)
 Nick Murray – drums, percussion (2010)
 Nick White – keyboards (2010)

References

Musical groups established in 2009
Musical groups disestablished in 2010
Musical groups from Los Angeles
American pop rock music groups